Coupland’s elevators (also known as chisels) are instruments commonly used for dental extraction. They are used in sets of three each of increasing size and are used to split multi-rooted teeth and are inserted between the bone and tooth roots and rotated to elevate them out of the sockets.
The instruments were designed by Doctor Douglas C W Coupland who qualified as a dental surgeon in Toronto in 1922 and spent most of his career practising dentistry in Ottawa where he specialised in dental extraction.
Coupland designed the instruments in the 1920s; they were manufactured by the Hu-Friedy company and sold from the early 1930s initially as sets of eight or twelve which were later reduced to three.
Coupland also designed a set of dental suckers with interchangeable tips. He died in 1936 after only 13 years of clinical practice.

References 

Dental equipment
Dentistry
Canadian inventions